The "Go U Northwestern", originally titled "Go Northwestern Go", is one of the fight songs of Northwestern University.

History and significance
The song was written in 1912 by Theodore Van Etten, a member of the Northwestern University Wildcat Marching Band at the time. It debuted November 23, 1912, at old Northwestern Field in Northwestern's football season-finale versus the Illinois Fighting Illini. 

The song, along with Northwestern's other fight song, "Rise, Northwestern!" (commonly called the "Push On Song" or simply "Push On!"), and the university's alma mater, "University Hymn" (sometimes "Quæcumque Sunt Vera") are Northwestern official school songs. "Go U Northwestern" or "Rise, Northwestern!" is played by the marching band during football games every time Northwestern scores against its opponent and at various other times during the game.

Other uses 
Along with being the Fight Song of Northwestern University, "Go U Northwestern" is the fight song for many high schools, with some using it under the original name.  Several other colleges and universities use the song as well, including Northern Oklahoma College Enid and the University of North Carolina at Greensboro from 1998 to 2010.

In popular culture
In an early 1970s Sesame Street sketch, Ernie sings the song's opening bars while wearing a football helmet, eager to open a present Bert has wrapped, that Ernie thinks is a new football for him.

References

External links
 "Hail to Purple", An unofficial Northwestern Wildcat Football website
 The official Northwestern University Marching Band website
 The Wildcat Songbook

American college songs
College fight songs in the United States
Big Ten Conference fight songs
Northwestern Wildcats